The Roseville Yard Disaster was an accidental explosion and fire that occurred on 28 April 1973, at a major Southern Pacific rail yard in the city of Roseville, California, USA. The shipment of munitions bound for the Vietnam War originated at the Hawthorne, Nevada Naval Ammunition Depot. There were no fatalities, although 48 people were injured.

Subsequent investigation pointed to a small fire in a box car caused by overheated brakes. The US military-owned box car was part of a train of military box cars carrying high explosive aircraft ammunition that had just arrived in the yard after descending from the Sierra Nevada into the Roseville Yard. The train had been switched to a Southern Pacific line in Sparks, Nevada, before descending from Donner Summit.

According to the  California Governor's Office of Emergency Service, "On April 28, 1973, in the Southern Pacific Railroad yard near the Northern California community of Roseville, a bomb detonated in one of the boxcars creating massive explosions, huge plumes of smoke in the air, destroyed buildings and rail sections and dug huge craters in the ground. Over a period of approximately 32 hours, 18 boxcars exploded in succession. The railroad yard was essentially destroyed."

References

1973 in California
Railway accidents in 1973
Explosions in 1973
Railway accidents and incidents in California
Roseville, California
April 1973 events in the United States
1973 disasters in the United States